Melanarctia ockendeni is a moth in the family Erebidae. It was described by Walter Rothschild in 1909. It is found in Peru.

References

Moths described in 1909
Phaegopterina